Palazzo Barbaro Wolkoff is a Venetian civil building located in the Dorsoduro district and overlooking the Grand Canal between Ca' Dario and Casa Salviati.

History
The building, initially built according to the canons of Venetian-Byzantine architecture, was then renovated by adding Gothic elements during the 15th century. 

In 1883, it was acquired by Russian painter Alexander Wolkoff. He had lasting relationship with an Italian actress Eleonora Duse. In 1894, as his guest, she lived on the top floor of the building.

Architecture
Made almost entirely of red brick, the highly asymmetrical façade stands out for its extraordinary vertical development and a mix of details: it is divided into the ground floor, mezzanine, main floor, and two upper floors. The arrangement of the decorative elements apparently lacks any order and makes it difficult to analyze the ensemble. The structure is dominated by the polifora of the noble floor, decorated by pointed frames. The top levels have monofora, bifora, trifora, and quadrifora, all placed asymmetrically. Paterae and coats of arms are the modern works.

Gallery

References

Houses completed in the 15th century
Barbaro Wolkoff
Barbaro Wolkoff
Gothic architecture in Venice